Elmer Township is the name of some places in the U.S. state of Minnesota:

 Elmer Township, Pipestone County, Minnesota
 Elmer Township, St. Louis County, Minnesota

See also 
 Elmer Township (disambiguation)

Minnesota township disambiguation pages